A Countess from Hong Kong is a 1967 British romantic comedy film scored, written, and directed by Charlie Chaplin, and the final film directed, written, produced and scored by him. Based on the life of a former Russian aristocrat as he calls her in his 1922 book My Trip Abroad. She was a Russian singer and dancer who "was a stateless person marooned in France without a passport"., the film starred Marlon Brando and Sophia Loren, and revolved around an American diplomat who falls in love with a stowaway on a cruise. Sydney Chaplin (Chaplin's son), Tippi Hedren, Patrick Cargill and Margaret Rutherford co-star in major supporting roles; Chaplin also made a cameo, marking his final screen appearance.

The story is based loosely on Russian singer and dancer Moussia "Skaya" Sodskaya, whom Chaplin met in France in 1921. The film had been in development since the 1930s under the title Stowaway, as a vehicle for Paulette Goddard. However, following their divorce and subsequent events in his life, Chaplin continued working on it until it was ready for production in the mid-1960s. It was ultimately his only film in colour, and one of two films Chaplin directed in which he did not play a major role (the other being 1923's A Woman of Paris).

The film premiered in London on 5 January 1967, receiving negative reviews from critics. Although a major success in Europe and Japan, it still underperformed at the box office, though the success of the music score was able to cover the budget. The film's theme song, "This Is My Song", written by Chaplin and performed by Petula Clark, became a worldwide success, topping the charts in the United Kingdom, Ireland, Australia, the Netherlands and Belgium, while reaching number three in the United States and number four in Canada. Since its release, the film has been reevaluated and received more positive reviews.

Plot
Ambassador-designate to Saudi Arabia Ogden Mears sails back to America after touring the world. At a layover in Hong Kong, Ogden meets Nataschaa Russian countess whose Shanghai Russian parents died after the family was expelled following the Russian Revolutionwho then sneaks into his cabin in evening dress to escape her life as a prostitute at a sailors' dance hall. A refugee, she has no passport, and she is forced to hide in his cabin during the voyage.

Ogden dislikes the situation, being a married man although seeking a divorce, and he worries how it might affect his career if she is found. But he reluctantly agrees to let her stay. They must then figure out how to get her off the ship, and it is arranged that she marry Hudson, his middle-aged valet.

Although it is only a formality, Hudson wishes to consummate the relationship, a wish she does not share. She avoids him until they dock in Honolulu, then jumps off the ship and swims ashore.

Ogden's wife Martha arrives in Honolulu to join the cruise, under advice from Washington that they avoid the impropriety of a divorce. Ogden's lawyer friend Harvey, who helped arrange the marriage, meets Natascha ashore and tells her that the immigration officers have accepted her as Hudson's wife, and she will remain in Honolulu. Martha confronts Ogden about Natascha, speaking rather roughly about her and her past lifestyle as a prostitute and the mistress of a gangster, having learned her past from a passenger who was Natascha's customer in Hong Kong. Ogden responds by asking if his wife would have done as well under such circumstances.

The ship sets sail for the U.S. mainland, but Ogden surprises Natascha in the hotel's cabaret where they begin dancing as he has left the ship and his wife.

Cast

In addition, Charlie Chaplin briefly appears as an Old Steward, while his daughters Geraldine, Josephine and Victoria make brief appearances as Girl at Dance (on the ship) and as Two Young Girls (entering the Waikiki Hotel), respectively.

Production
The idea, according to a press release written by Chaplin, "resulted from a visit I made to Shanghai in 1931 where I came across a number of titled aristocrats who had escaped the Russian Revolution. They were destitute and without a country; their status was of the lowest grade. The men ran rickshaws and the women worked in ten-cent dance halls. When the Second World War broke out many of the old aristocrats had died and the younger generation migrated to Hong Kong where their plight was even worse, for Hong Kong was overcrowded with refugees." Chaplin had written a draft of the script in the 1930s under the working title The Stowaway, as a starring vehicle for his then-wife Paulette Goddard. However, amidst work for The Great Dictator, Goddard signed a contract with Paramount Pictures, and left Chaplin the following year. Although Chaplin and Goddard agreed to make one more film together in their divorce settlement, the idea never materialized. In the years after, Chaplin worked on the script in increments, "adding a bit here, cutting a bit there."

In 1963, a friend of Chaplin suggested to him Sophia Loren for the lead role of Natascha, the Russian princess. For the character of Ogden, he originally wanted Rex Harrison or Cary Grant to play the role, but eventually Marlon Brando was cast. By 1965, both Brando and Sophia Loren committed to the film without reading a script. Tippi Hedren, who broke with Alfred Hitchcock, also signed on for the film without reading the script, and was disappointed to learn the insignificance of her role. Although Chaplin tried to accommodate her, he could not, as the story mostly takes place on a ship that Hedren's character boards near the end of the film. In the end, she remained in the film and later said that it was a pleasure working for him. Chaplin cast his son Sydney in a supporting role, as well as his three eldest daughters in cameo appearances: Geraldine (at minutes 46 and 65), Josephine and Victoria Chaplin (at minute 92).

Production began on 25 January 1966 at Pinewood Studios in Buckinghamshire, just outside London. The film was the second of Universal's European unit, following Fahrenheit 451. Production was frequently interrupted by Brando arriving late and then being hospitalized with appendicitis; Chaplin and Brando having the flu; and Loren marrying Carlo Ponti.

Hedren described Chaplin's directorial technique in the following way: "Chaplin’s method was to act out all our different roles, which was brilliant to watch. Instead of directing, he’d get out there on set and say: 'OK, do this,' and show us how. He’d become Sophia Loren. He’d become me and Marlon. It was really unusual and I’d never seen it happen before." Although many members of the cast appreciated Chaplin's approach, Marlon Brando felt insulted and wanted to quit before Chaplin was able to persuade him to finish the picture. Brando came to consider Chaplin a "fearsomely cruel man", claiming that Chaplin: "was an egotistical tyrant and a penny-pincher. He harassed people when they were late, and scolded them unmercifully to work faster." Brando was particularly angered by what he regarded as the cruel way that Chaplin treated his son Sydney, who had a supporting role in the picture: "Chaplin was probably the most sadistic man I’d ever met."

Home media
The film was released on VHS in 1996, as part of the Universal Cinema Classics series. In 2003 it was released on DVD in widescreen format, and later re-released as part of the DVD set Marlon Brando: The Franchise Collection. It is now on Blu-ray.

Reception
The film received largely negative reviews, though it has a 60% rating on Rotten Tomatoes.

The New York Times review for 17 March 1967 stated: "...if an old fan of Mr. Chaplin's movies could have his charitable way, he would draw the curtain fast on this embarrassment and pretend it never occurred".
Leonard Maltin's Movie and Video Guide 1995 gave it one-and-a-half stars, stating it was "badly shot, badly timed, badly scored".
TV Guide gave the movie one star, with the comment "a dismal, uninviting comedy".
Radio Times gave the film two stars, stating that "it's all too staid and too stagey".
Tim Hunter writing in The Harvard Crimson for 25 April 1967 gave it a fairly good review, stating: "Take the new Chaplin film on its own terms; contrary to all those patronizing critics, the old man hasn't really lost his touch, and Countess is a glorious romance".
Christopher Null of Filmcritic.com gave it three stars, stating, however: "...the repetitive story (with Loren repeatedly running to hide in Brando's bathroom when there's a knock on the door) gets tiresome".
Chaplin biographer Jeffrey Vance, writing in 2003, maintains: "A Countess from Hong Kong is less interesting than any of Chaplin's previous sound films because it contains neither political nor satirical elements" (although there is a scene where an old lady renounces a stuffed animal's "red" tongue). Vance believes some of Chaplin's own comic vision and optimism is infused in Sophia Loren's role. A dance-hall girl, Loren's character of Natascha—a prostitute—"perpetuates Chaplin's lifelong fascination with fallen women as heroines. In many ways, Natascha is the proxy for the Tramp in the film, searching for a better life, while always understanding that both happiness and beauty are fleeting. The Tramp's philosophy is expressed by Natascha's dialogue, 'Don't be sad. That's too easy. Be like me. At this moment, I'm very happy...That's all we can ask for—this moment.' This statement can be applied to the film as well: while it is easy to lament its many failures, particularly because it is Chaplin's last film, it is perhaps best to cherish its wonderful, fleeting comic moments."

Critics such as Tim Hunter and Andrew Sarris, as well as poet John Betjeman and director François Truffaut, viewed the film as being among Chaplin's best works. Actor Jack Nicholson is also reportedly a big fan of the film.

See also
Shanghai Russian

References

External links

1967 films
1967 romantic comedy films
British romantic comedy films
Films about immigration to the United States
Films directed by Charlie Chaplin
Films set in Hong Kong
Films set on ships
Films shot at Pinewood Studios
Universal Pictures films
1960s English-language films
1960s British films